Todd Gardenhire (born May 7, 1948) is an American politician and a Republican member of the Tennessee Senate representing District 10 since January 8, 2013.

Education
Gardenhire earned his B.S. in business administration from the University of Tennessee at Chattanooga in 1972.

Elections
2012 With District 10 incumbent Democratic Senator Andy Berke running for mayor of Chattanooga and leaving the seat open, Gardenhire ran in the August 2, 2012, Republican Primary, winning by 40 votes with 8,022 votes (50.1%), and won the November 6, 2012, General election with 49,472 votes (69.2%) against Democratic nominee Andraé McGary.

Voting Record

Personal life
Gardenhire is married and has four children and five grandchildren. He is a Presbyterian.

References

External links
Official page at the Tennessee General Assembly

Todd Gardenhire at Ballotpedia
Todd Gardenhire at OpenSecrets

Place of birth missing (living people)
Living people
Republican Party members of the Tennessee House of Representatives
Politicians from Chattanooga, Tennessee
Republican Party Tennessee state senators
University of Tennessee at Chattanooga alumni
21st-century American politicians
1948 births